Kahpe Bizans (English: Perfidious Byzantine) is a 2000 Turkish comedy film directed by Gani Müjde. It is a parody of 1970s, kitsch Turkish historical drama movies.

Cast
Mehmet Ali Erbil as  İmparator İlletyus 
Demet Şener as  Emmanuelle 
Cem Davran as Yetiş Bey, Markus Antonyus 
Sümer Tilmaç as Süper Gazi 
Ayşegül Aldinç as Teodora 
Nurseli İdiz as  Helena 
Hande Ataizi as  Mağdure Hanım 
Yılmaz Köksal as  Sepetçioğlu 
Cengiz Küçükayvaz as Simitis 
Suat Sungur as Tavşan Bey 
Günay Karacaoğlu as  Anaç Hatun 
Ümit Okur as Teodorakis 
Belma Canciğer as  Arap Bacı 
Cem Karaca as  Saz aşığı
Metin Şentürk as Saray bekçisi 
Sencan Güleryüz as  Lombelikus 
Cezmi Baskın as  Hacı Makarios Çelebi 
Kerem Kupacı as Borazancı

External links 

2000 comedy films
2000 films
2000s historical comedy films
2000s Turkish-language films
Films set in the Byzantine Empire
Films set in Turkey
Turkish historical comedy films